The following highways are numbered 833:

United States